Barcelona, Catalonia, Spain  is divided into 10 districts. These are administrated by a councillor designated by the main city council, and each of them have some powers relating to issues such as urbanism or infrastructure in their area. The current division of the city into different districts was approved in 1984. In 2009 Barcelona started using a new division of 73 neighbourhoods (the 10 districts are still in use), a division that was done for a better service from the City Council.

Some of these districts have a previous history as independent municipalities which were integrated into the city of Barcelona during the late 19th century and the first half of the 20th century, such as Sarrià, Les Corts, Sant Andreu de Palomar, Gràcia or Sant Martí de Provençals. However, other municipalities which are contiguous to Barcelona (such as L'Hospitalet de Llobregat, Badalona, Sant Adrià de Besòs or Montcada i Reixac) have remained separate towns to this day, and are part of the much larger metropolitan area of Barcelona.

Gallery

See also
History of Barcelona
Urban planning of Barcelona
Street names in Barcelona

References

External links

Barcelona Neighbourhoods: El Born on Homage to BCN